John Ensminger may refer to:

 John Ensminger, American drummer for Dog Fashion Disco and Polkadot Cadaver
 John C. Ensminger (1934–2022), American businessman and Louisiana State Senator